This is a list of National Hockey League statistical leaders by country of birth, sorted by total points. The top ten players from each country are included. Statistics are current through the end of the 2021–22 NHL season and players currently playing in the National Hockey League are marked in boldface.

All players are listed by the current country of the players' birth location, regardless of their citizenship, where they were trained in hockey or what country they represented internationally.



Country

Canada

Czech Republic

Slovakia

Finland

Russia

United States

Sweden

Slovenia

United Kingdom

Ukraine

Serbia

Germany

Austria

France

Lithuania

Latvia

Switzerland

Norway

Denmark

Kazakhstan

Paraguay

Poland

Republic of China (Taiwan)

South Korea

Belarus

Netherlands

Brazil

Estonia

Brunei

Italy

Venezuela

Haiti

Uzbekistan

South Africa

Tanzania

Jamaica

Lebanon

Australia

Japan

Nigeria

Indonesia

Bulgaria

Belgium

Croatia

Bahamas

See also
 List of NHL statistical leaders
 List of countries with their first National Hockey League player

Notes

 Almost all players on this list from Russia, Ukraine, Latvia, Lithuania, Kazakhstan, and Belarus were born in the Soviet Union – in the Russian SFSR, Ukrainian SSR, Latvian SSR, Lithuanian SSR, Kazakh SSR, and Byelorussian SSR respectively. The Soviet Union officially dissolved at the end of 1991. Many of these players have represented both the Soviet Union and their respective nation in international competitions.
 Almost all players on this list from the Czech Republic or Slovakia were born in Czechoslovakia. Czechoslovakia officially dissolved at the end of 1992. Many of these players have represented both Czechoslovakia and their respective nation in international competitions.
 Almost every player on this list from Germany was born in West Germany. The exceptions are Mikhail Grabovski, born in East Germany, and Walt Tkaczuk, born shortly after World War II in the portion of Allied-occupied Germany that became West Germany in 1949. West Germany and East Germany reunited in 1990. Some of these players have represented both West Germany and Germany in international competitions.

External links
 Career stats from NHL.com
 The Internet Hockey Database
 Legends of Hockey
 NHL Finland
 Birth Countries of NHL Players, databasehockey.com

Statistical leaders by country
Statistical leaders by country